Mateja Bačanin (born 22 September 2003) is a Serbian football attacking midfielder who plays for Radnički Sremska Mitrovica.

References

External links
 
 

2003 births
Living people
Association football midfielders
Serbian footballers
Serbian First League players
RFK Grafičar Beograd players
Sportspeople from Smederevo